The following lists events that happened during 1995 in Chile.

Incumbents
President of Chile: Eduardo Frei Ruiz-Tagle

Events 

 Hypermarket Líder is founded.

July
30 July – 1995 Antofagasta earthquake

August
August – White Earthquake

September
5–7 September – 1995 South American Junior Championships in Athletics

December
1–2 December – 1995 Chilean telethon

Sport

 1995 Movistar Open
 1995 Primera División de Chile
 1995 Canada Cup
 1995 Copa Chile
 Chile national football team 1995
 Chile at the 1995 Pan American Games

Births
19 October – Sammis Reyes, American football player

Deaths
11 January – Roque Esteban Scarpa (born 1914)
12 April – Alberto Larraguibel (born 1919)
1 October – Felipe Rivera (born 1971)
27 October – Marta Colvin (born 1907)

References 

 
Years of the 20th century in Chile
Chile